Lavat is a surname. It may refer to:

Adriana Lavat (born 1974), Mexican actress and television host
Jorge Lavat (1933−2011), Mexican film and television actor
José Lavat (1948–2018), Mexican voice actor
Queta Lavat  (born 1929), Mexican film and television actress
Luis Lavat (born 2003), Professional Loser